Bangladesh Film Censor Board  is a regulatory agency that is responsible for the censorship of movies and is located in  Dhaka, Bangladesh.

History
The censor board was set up in 1977 following the framing of Bangladesh Censorship of Film Rules. The agency is responsible for the censorship of locally produced movies, foreign imports and acts as the registration of film clubs in Bangladesh. Martuza Ahmed the secretary of Ministry of Information is the ex-officio chairman of the board. The board in 2015 blocked My Bicycle, the first chakma language (a minority language) in Bangladesh. The Censor also blocked a movie about the Rana Plaza building collapse in which more than a thousand garment workers died. A movie was banned where the villain wore a Mujib coat, a style associated with the founding president of Bangladesh, Sheikh Mujib.

References

1977 establishments in Bangladesh
Organisations based in Dhaka
Government agencies of Bangladesh
Film censorship by country
Ministry of Information and Broadcasting (Bangladesh)